The 1998 Georgia Tech Yellow Jackets football team represented the Georgia Institute of Technology in the 1998 NCAA Division I-A football season. The team's coach was George O'Leary. Tech played its home games at Bobby Dodd Stadium in Atlanta.

Schedule

Rankings

References

Georgia Tech
Georgia Tech Yellow Jackets football seasons
Atlantic Coast Conference football champion seasons
Gator Bowl champion seasons
Georgia Tech Yellow Jackets football